Sharma Nithiyanandam is an Anglican bishop in the Church of South India: he was consecrated Bishop of Vellore on 19 May 2019.

Nithiyanandham was educated at Leonard Theological College.  He has served Vellore Diocese as Chairman of its youth, hostel  and mission boards;  General Convener of the 40th anniversary of the diocesan formation; and as Honorary Secretary of the Diocesan Council.

He and his wife Jessie have one child, a son Irenaeus.

References

 

Anglican bishops of Vellore
Living people
21st-century Anglican bishops
Leonard Theological College alumni
1963 births
Indian Christian religious leaders